After School is the fourth extended play (EP) by American singer-songwriter Melanie Martinez. It was released on September 25, 2020, through Atlantic Records. "The Bakery" was released as the lead single the same day as the EP's release. Martinez stated this EP was "much more personal and steps outside of the Cry Baby character box for a moment". The EP was also released as the deluxe edition to Martinez's second studio album, K–12.

Background
In an interview with V magazine in September 2019, Martinez stated that she would release songs that were in-line with her previous album, K–12, but that the songs would be "more personal and more vulnerable". On January 7, 2020, Martinez announced through her Instagram stories that she would release an EP titled After School that would be attached to the K–12 era. The EP was originally scheduled to be released sometime in the spring of 2020. Martinez also previously announced that she had planned two more films, both of which would be accompanied by albums, but has not yet announced involvement from After School.

On February 9, 2020, Martinez confirmed through her Instagram story that the EP would be out in spring, but it was pushed back to September 25, and that a song featuring "one of [her] fav  artists" would be coming out "sooner than you think". The next day, February 10, she released the standalone single "Copy Cat", with American rapper and songwriter Tierra Whack. The song was originally intended to be the lead single from the EP, but was cut from the final track listing.

On September 15, 2020, Martinez posted a surrealist photo on Instagram of her in a nest with two eggs, with a caption reading; "Holdin' onto these eggs till they're ready to be hatched next week", teasing that the EP would be released the next week. In an interview with Idolator, Martinez expressed interest in making a music video for "Test Me", saying that she wrote a video treatment and that "it all depends on how much people connect with it".

Track listing

Notes
 "Brain & Heart" contains an interpolation of "If You Had My Love" by Jennifer Lopez.

Personnel
Musicians
 Melanie Martinez – lead vocals, songwriter 
 Michael Keenan – songwriter, producer 
 Blake Slatkin – songwriter, producer 
Rodney Jerkins – songwriter 
Fred Jerkins III – songwriter 
LaShawn Daniels – songwriter 
Cory Rooney – songwriter 
Jennifer Lopez – songwriter 

Technical
 Randy Merrill – mastering engineer 
 Mitch McCarthy – mixing engineer

Charts

Release history

Notes

References

2020 EPs
Melanie Martinez (singer) albums